The Lives Inside the Lines in Your Hand is the tenth studio album by Matt Pond PA, released on February 5, 2013. At Metacritic, which assigns a weighted average score reviews from mainstream critics, the album received a score of 65 out of 100, based on 7 reviews, indicating "generally favorable reviews."

Track listing

 "Let Me Live" – 3:42
 "Love to Get Used" – 3:32
 "Starlet" – 3:55
 "When the Moon Brings the Silver" – 3:10
 "Go Where the Leaves Go" – 3:43
 "Bring Back the Orchestra" – 3:08
 "Hole in My Heart" – 3:19
 "Human Beings" – 3:52
 "The Lives Inside the Lines in Your Hand" – 4:29
 "Strafford" – 2:52
 ”Lily 3” (Bonus Track) - 2:56

References

2013 albums
Matt Pond PA albums
Bertelsmann Music Group albums